Parlatoria pergandii is a species of armored scale insect in the family Diaspididae.

References

Further reading

 
 
 
 

Diaspididae
Insects described in 1881